The Admirable was a First Rank three-decker ship of the line of the French Royal Navy. She was intended to be armed with 88 guns (like the similar Orgueilleux built alongside her at Lorient), but was modified during construction and completed with 82 guns, comprising six huge 48-pounders plus eighteen 36-pounder guns on the lower deck, twenty-eight 18-pounder guns on the middle deck, and twenty-four 8-pounder guns on the upper deck, with six 6-pounder guns on the quarterdeck.

Designed and constructed by Laurent Coulomb, she was begun at Lorient Dockyard in September 1690 and launched on 10 September of the following year. She was completed in March 1692 and took part in the Battle of Barfleur on 29 May 1692; damaged in that battle, she was run ashore at Cherbourg where she was burnt by boats from Englkish warships on 1 June 1692. A replacement for her was built at Lorient later the same year by Laurent Coulomb.

References

Nomenclature des Vaisseaux du Roi-Soleil de 1661 a 1715. Alain Demerliac (Editions Omega, Nice – various dates).
The Sun King's Vessels (2015) - Jean-Claude Lemineur; English translation by François Fougerat. Editions ANCRE.  
Winfield, Rif and Roberts, Stephen (2017) French Warships in the Age of Sail 1626-1786: Design, Construction, Careers and Fates. Seaforth Publishing. . 

Ships of the line of the French Navy
1690s ships
Ships built in France